Permissive Working on a railway in the United Kingdom allows more than one train at a time to be on the same line in a block section, a signal section or a dead-end platform line.

Authorisation
The areas where Permissive Working is allowed are given in Table A of the Network Rail Sectional Appendix.

Exceptions

Even where it is not authorised, a shunting movement can be allowed to enter a portion of line that is already occupied providing that it is for the purpose of:
attaching vehicles
detaching vehicles
removing vehicles.

Driving towards another train

When it is permitted to drive a train towards the rear of another train, such as where trains queue to enter or exit a depot, the driver must:
proceed with caution
not pass a signal which has been cleared for the train in front until it has been replaced to danger and then cleared for their movement.

References

Railway signalling block systems